In Hinduism, vibhuti, also called bhasma or thiruneeru, is sacred ash made of burnt dried wood, burnt cow dung and/or cremated bodies used in Agamic rituals. Hindu devotees apply vibhuti traditionally as three horizontal lines across the forehead and other parts of the body to honour Shiva. Vibhuti smeared across the forehead to the end of both eyebrows is called tripundra. 

According to the Shiva Purana, the particles of ash which cling to the skin when tripundra is applied are to be considered to be individual lingams. The scriptures further state that bhasma purifies the soul and elevates the devotee of Shiva, and that works done without wearing bhasma are fruitless. There are various methods for the application of the ashes, according to the Shiva Purana, and various mantras to be recited during application.

Other uses

Another meaning of vibhuti is a 'glorious form', in contrast with avatar, a reincarnation of Brahman. 

Vaishnava theology describes a vibhuti as 'incarnation of power', a temporary occasional manifestation such as when holy men are infused with divine virtues and qualities are infused.

Sri Aurobindo mentions a vibhuti as "the hero of a race's struggle towards divine achievement, the hero in the Carlylean sense of heroism, a power of God in man."

See also
 Bindi
 Kumkum
 Rudraksha
 Tilaka

References

Further reading
Dictionary of Hindu Lore and Legend by Anna Dallapiccola

External links

Vibhuti in Lingayat religion

Yoga concepts
Objects used in Hindu worship